Gloria is a Croatian language weekly women's magazine published in Zagreb, Croatia. As of 2007, it was the best-selling weekly magazine in Croatia.

History and profile
Gloria was first published on 8 February 1994. The magazine is published on a weekly basis.

With a circulation of 130,000 copies in 2007, Gloria was the best-selling weekly magazine in Croatia. A significant part of the magazine's circulation is sold in Bosnia and Herzegovina. A licensed edition of the magazine is published by Europapress Beograd, a subsidiary of Europapress Holding, and the magazine is sold in Serbia, Montenegro, North Macedonia and Republika Srpska.

Gloria'''s focus is coverage of the international jet set, as well as Croatian high society events. Like many other women's magazines, Gloria'' has columns on beauty, fashion trends, and sex and romance. One of the magazine's regular columnists was Žuži Jelinek.

References

1994 establishments in Croatia
Magazines published in Croatia
Croatian-language magazines
Magazines established in 1994
Mass media in Zagreb
Weekly magazines
Women's magazines
History of women in Croatia